Pilger may refer to:

People with the surname
Detlev Pilger, German politician
John Pilger, Australian journalist
Robert Knud Friedrich Pilger, German botanist
Zoe Pilger, British author and art critic

Places
Pilger, Nebraska, United States
Pilger, Saskatchewan, Canada

See also